Čungā́x̌, is the name of the fourth month of the Afghan calendar. It occurs in the summer season (from June 21/22 to July 21/22) and it has 31 days.

Čungāx̌ corresponds with the tropical Zodiac sign Cancer. Čungāx́̌ literally means "crab" in Pashto.

Events 
 2 - 1358 - Chindawol uprising begins

Births

Deaths 

Pashto names for the months of the Solar Hijri calendar

ps:چنګاښ(مياشت)